Louis de Bourbon-Busset (14 April 1875 – 23 July 1954) was a French sports shooter. He competed in the team clay pigeon event at the 1924 Summer Olympics.

References

External links
 

Sportspeople from Moulins, Allier
1875 births
1954 deaths
French male sport shooters
Lo
Olympic shooters of France
Shooters at the 1924 Summer Olympics
École Spéciale Militaire de Saint-Cyr alumni
Officiers of the Légion d'honneur
20th-century French people